This is a list of all funiculars in Switzerland, commercially operated according to a timetable.

See also

List of funicular railways
List of heritage railways and funiculars in Switzerland
List of aerial tramways in Switzerland
List of mountain railways in Switzerland
List of mountains of Switzerland accessible by public transport

References

!
Funicular railways in Switzerland